Gülhan Kılıç (born 5 May 1989) is a Turkish former Paralympic judoka who competed at international judo competitions. She is a four-time European medalist and has competed at the 2012 Summer Paralympics where she lost in the first round to eventual champion Ramona Brussig and in the first repechage to bronze medalist Michele Ferreira. She has also competed at the 2015 European Games but did not medal.

References

1989 births
Living people
Turkish female judoka
Paralympic judoka of Turkey
Judoka at the 2012 Summer Paralympics
Judoka at the 2015 European Games
20th-century Turkish sportswomen
21st-century Turkish sportswomen